The 1975–76 Soviet Championship League season was the 30th season of the Soviet Championship League, the top level of ice hockey in the Soviet Union. 10 teams participated in the league, and Spartak Moscow won the championship.

Regular season

Relegation 
 Dizelist Penza – SKA Leningrad 3:6, 2:8

External links
Season on hockeystars.ru

1975–76 in Soviet ice hockey
Soviet League seasons
Sov